Transgender Equality Network of Ireland (TENI) is an Irish nonprofit organisation founded in 2006, which seeks to improve conditions and rights for transgender people and their families in Ireland.

STAD: Stop Transphobia and Discrimination 
In 2013 TENI launched the STAD: Stop Transphobia and Discrimination campaign. The campaign sought to raise awareness of transphobic hate crimes by collecting and providing data to stakeholders such as the Garda Síochána. The first report was launched on 18 June 2014 at the University of Limerick. The report offered six recommendations:

 Transphobic incidents should be logged on the PULSE (Police Using Leading Systems Effectively) system
 Additional training should be provided for police officers
 Conduct further research
 Improve the relationship between the trans community and the police
 Advocate for legislation to protect trans people
 Educate the public about transphobia

National Transgender Healthcare Conference 
On 3 December 2015, in partnership with the HSE, TENI co-hosted the first National Transgender Healthcare Conference in Carlow. The conference, which was attended by 380 healthcare professionals, sought to highlight issues that transgender people face accessing health services in Ireland.  This conference led to the publication of the HSE's Health Report towards meeting the health care needs of lesbian, gay, bisexual and transgender people.

Gender Recognition Bill 2017 
In 2013, TENI supported the recommendation of the Social Protection Committee to lower the legal age for gender recognition from 18 to 16. This led to the passing of the Gender Recognition Act 2017. This Act amends the Gender Recognition Act 2015 in three ways:

 Provide a right to self determination for persons who have reached the age of 16 years
 Introduce a right to legal gender recognition for persons under the age of 16 years
 Ensure consideration of the status of non-binary persons in Irish law

Strategy for Education and Skills 2016–18 
TENI made a submission on the Strategy for Education and Skills 2016–18 to improve the conditions and advance the rights of trans people and their families.

Publications 
 Speaking from the Margins: Trans Mental Health and Wellbeing in Ireland
 STAD: Stop Transphobia and Discrimination Report

See also
 Transgender rights in Ireland

References

External links 

 

Transgender organizations
LGBT organisations in Ireland